Euro gold and silver commemorative coins are special euro coins minted and issued by member states of the Eurozone, mainly in gold and silver, although other precious metals are also used in rare occasions. Monaco was one of the first countries allowed to introduced the euro (€) on 1 January 2002, although they are not officially part of the Eurozone. Since then, the Monnaie de Paris in France have been minting both normal issues of Monégasque euro coins, which are intended for circulation, and commemorative euro coins in gold and silver.

These special coins have a legal tender only in Monaco, unlike the normal issues of the Monegasque euro coins, which have a legal tender in every country of the Eurozone. This means that the commemorative coins made of gold and silver cannot be used as money in other countries. Furthermore, as their bullion value and collectable value generally vastly exceeds their face value, these coins are not intended to be used as means of payment at all—although it remains possible. For this reason, they are usually named Collectors' coins.

The coins usually commemorate the anniversaries of historical events or draw attention to current events of special importance. Monaco mints one of these coins on average per year, in both gold and silver, with face value ranging from 5 to 100 euros.

Summary 
As of 28 December 2008, seven variations of Monegasque euro commemorative coins have been minted: one in 2002, two in 2003, one in 2004, one in 2005 and two in 2008. These special high-value commemorative coins are not to be confused with €2 commemorative coins, which are coins designated for circulation and do have legal tender status in all countries of the Eurozone.

The following table shows the number of coins minted per year. In the first section, the coins are grouped by the metal used, while in the second section they are grouped by their face value.

2002 Coinage

2003 Coinage

2004 Coinage

2005 Coinage

2008 Coinage

2011 Coinage

2012 Coinage

Notes 

Monaco
Currencies of Monaco